The 2002 Tennessee gubernatorial election was held on November 5, 2002. The incumbent, Don Sundquist, was term-limited and is prohibited by the Constitution of Tennessee from seeking a third consecutive term. To succeed him, former Nashville Mayor Phil Bredesen, the Democratic nominee, who had run against Sundquist in 1994, narrowly defeated United States Congressman Van Hilleary, the Republican nominee, in the general election.

Democratic primary

Candidates
Phil Bredesen, former Mayor of Nashville, 1994 Democratic nominee for governor
Randy Nichols, Knox County District Attorney General
Charles E. Smith, former Tennessee Commissioner of Education
Charles V. Brown
L. Best
Floyd R. Conover

Results

Republican primary

Candidates
Van Hilleary, Representative from Tennessee's 4th congressional district
Jim Henry, former Minority Leader of the Tennessee House of Representatives
Bob Tripp
Dave Kelley
Jessie D. McDonald

Results

General election

Candidates

Major
Phil Bredesen (D)
Van Hilleary (R)
Edwin C. Sanders (I)
Carl Two Feathers Whitaker (I)
John Jay Hooker (I)
David Gatchell (I)
Gabriel Givens (I)
Ray Ledford (I)
James E. Herren (I)
Charles V. Wilhoit, Jr. (I)
Marivuana Stout Leinoff (I)
Francis E. Waldron (I)
Ronny Simmons (I)
Robert O. Watson (I)
Basil Marceaux (I)

Predictions

Polling

Results

Notes

References

External links
Official campaign websites (Archived)
Phil Bredesen for Governor
Van Hilleary for Governor

Gubernatorial
2002
Tennessee